"Coward of the County" is a song written by Roger Bowling and Billy Edd Wheeler and recorded by American country music singer Kenny Rogers. The song was released in November 1979 as the second single from Rogers' multi-platinum album Kenny. It became a major crossover hit, topping the Billboard Country chart and reaching #3 on the Hot 100 chart; it also topped the Cash Box singles chart and was a Top 10 hit in numerous other countries worldwide, topping the chart in Canada, the UK and Ireland, where it remained at #1 for six consecutive weeks.

Content
The narrator sings about his ward and nephew Tommy, widely considered a coward. Tommy's nonviolent attitude was influenced by his father, who had died in prison when Tommy was ten years old. During Tommy's last visit with his father, from his deathbed Tommy's father pleaded with him to avoid the same mistakes that he had made ("promise me, son, not to do the things I've done..."), telling him that "turning the other cheek" is not a sign of weakness and advising him, "Son, you don't have to fight to be a man."

Years later, Tommy is in a relationship with a woman named Becky who loves and accepts him. One day while Tommy is at work, the three Gatlin brothers sexually assault Becky. When he returns home and finds Becky crying, he must choose between defending her honor or upholding his father's plea to "walk away from trouble when he can."

When Tommy enters the barroom, the Gatlins laugh at him. Tommy then fights all three Gatlin boys, knocking each to the floor. He hopes that his father understands that "sometimes you gotta fight when you're a man."

Controversy regarding "The Gatlin Boys" lyric
It has been claimed that mention of the "Gatlin boys ... there was three of them" in the song was a reference to the Gatlin Brothers. However, in The Billboard Book of Number One Country Singles, Rogers stated that he was unaware of the connection and that he would have otherwise asked for the name to be changed. Larry Gatlin liked the song, and songwriter Billy Edd Wheeler denied that the lyric was a reference to the Gatlin Brothers.

Gatlin later claimed in an interview on The Adam Carolla Show that the song’s cowriter Roger Bowling held a personal grudge against him for unknown reasons. Gatlin stated that when Bowling won song of the year for "Lucille" at the 1977 CMA Awards, Gatlin approached Bowling to congratulate him, but Bowling said "fuck you, Gatlin!' and an exchange of harsh words followed. Gatlin claimed that the incident led to the inclusion of his name in the lyrics for "Coward of the County."

Chart performance

Weekly charts

Year-end charts

Cover versions
Alvin and the Chipmunks covered the song with several lyric changes for the 1981 album Urban Chipmunk.

Jamaican dancehall musician Sister Nancy performed a version on her 1982 album "One, Two" as "Coward of the Country." Her version also includes elements of the songs "Banana Boat Song" and "In the Ghetto."

Film adaptation

The song inspired a 1981 television movie of the same name directed by Dick Lowry, who also directed all but the last of The Gambler television movie saga pentalogy.

The film stars Rogers as Tommy's uncle Reverend Matthew Spencer (who sang the song in the film), and features Fredric Lehne as Tommy Spencer, Largo Woodruff as Becky and William Schreiner as James Joseph "Jimmy Joe" Gatlin, the lead bully of the Gatlin family clan. The movie added several characters not mentioned in the song, including Car-Wash (Noble Willingham), a friend of the Spencers, Violet (Ana Alicia), another local girl who is also in love with Tommy and Lem Gatlin (Joe Dorsey), the father of the Gatlin boys.

Set in small-town Georgia during the onset of America's involvement in World War II, the film's plot expands on the story in the song. Jimmy Joe Gatlin proclaims that Becky is his girl, although Becky repeatedly states that she is not. Her rejection of Jimmy Joe's advances and her romance with Tommy cause the Gatlins to assault Becky just days before she and Tommy are to be married.

In a huge barroom brawl with the Gatlins, Tommy prevails with the help of Matthew, who has recently resigned his position with the church. After the Gatlin brothers are convicted for gang-raping Becky, Tommy joins the Marines and must report for duty after his wedding to Becky, and the church deacons invite Matthew to return.

References

1979 singles
1979 songs
Kenny Rogers songs
Cashbox number-one singles
RPM Top Singles number-one singles
Irish Singles Chart number-one singles
Song recordings produced by Larry Butler (producer)
Songs about sexual assault
Songs written by Billy Edd Wheeler
Songs written by Roger Bowling (songwriter)
UK Singles Chart number-one singles
United Artists Records singles